Lone Pine Koala Sanctuary is an  koala sanctuary in the Brisbane suburb of Fig Tree Pocket in Queensland, Australia.

Founded in 1927, it is the oldest and largest koala sanctuary of its kind in the world. The park houses approximately 80 species of Australian animals.

History 
The name originates from a lone hoop pine that was planted by the Clarkson family, the first owners of the  site. The sanctuary opened in 1927 to provide a safe refuge to sick, injured, and orphaned koalas, at a time when they were being killed for their fur. The founder of the sanctuary, Claude Reid, recognised the need to protect this iconic species and initiated the protection of their habitat.

The sanctuary began with two koalas called Jack and Jill. Lone Pine became known internationally during World War II when Americans, including Douglas MacArthur's wife, visited the park to view the native Australian animals.

Wildlife 

Visitors are allowed to hold koalas for a fee. Strict regulations ensure that each koala is not held for more than thirty minutes every day. Fees paid for souvenir photos help fund new enclosures, research projects and eucalyptus plantations.

Visitors can feed and pet the free-roaming kangaroos in the  kangaroo reserve, where more than 130 of the animals freely reside.

Rainbow lorikeets fly to the Lone Pine Koala Sanctuary for the specially prepared nectar meals at the sanctuary. Visitors can feed the lorikeets directly twice a day. Once a day there is a bird of prey show with several kinds of raptors showing off their speed agility and keen eyesight.

The 'Koala Forest' is a large koala enclosure with over 30 koalas surrounding the customers. The koalas are fed mid-morning and mid-afternoon.

Lone Pine Koala Sanctuary opened their new world-class koala science and research facility, the Brisbane Koala Science Institute, on Saturday 30 June 2018. Constructed in collaboration with the Brisbane City Council, the facility is home to two full-time research staff, a research laboratory, and a ‘Koala Biobank’ (koala genetic depository). Through joint projects with universities and other research establishments, the institute will be working towards real, practical outcomes for local koala populations. Taking advantage of the sanctuary's central location, Lone Pine hopes to improve collaboration within the science community through the use of the Institutes’ meeting spaces and seminar hall. Guests to Lone Pine will be able to enjoy the Institute daily from 9am-5pm, via the public viewing area complete with interactive displays, koala skywalk, and viewing windows into the sanctuary's wildlife kitchen, research laboratory, and wildlife hospital. Access to the facility is included in entry to the sanctuary.

Mammals

Birds

Reptiles and amphibians

Transport
There is an entrance to the sanctuary from a car park, and also an entrance to the sanctuary from the Brisbane River. One can arrive by private car or taxi, a journey of approximately 20 minutes from the city centre. One can also catch a Brisbane Transport bus, or arrive by ferry or express boat from the Queensland Cultural Centre pontoon.

Photos

Awards 
In 2009 as part of the Q150 celebrations, the Lone Pine Koala Sanctuary was announced as one of the Q150 Icons of Queensland for its role as a "location".

See also

 Australian Koala Foundation
 Marsupial
 Koala Park Sanctuary, Sydney
 Koala Farm, Adelaide

References

External links 

 
 Wildlife, Parks and Gardens – SunZine

1927 establishments in Australia
Zoos established in 1927
Buildings and structures in Brisbane
Tourist attractions in Queensland
Zoos in Queensland
Wildlife parks in Australia
Animal charities based in Australia
Articles containing video clips
Koalas